Iván Martín may refer to:
Iván Martín (footballer, born 1995), Spanish football forward
Iván Martín (footballer, born 1999), Spanish football midfielder